The 2010 Grand Prix motorcycle racing season was the 62nd F.I.M. Road Racing World Championship season. The season consisted out of 18 races for the MotoGP class and 17 for the 125cc and Moto2 classes, beginning with the Qatar motorcycle Grand Prix on 11 April 2010 and ending with the Valencian Community motorcycle Grand Prix on 7 November. It was the first season for the new Moto2 class.

Preseason

Moto2 introduction
The Moto2 class replaced the 250cc class for 2010. The original intention was for Moto2 bikes to run alongside the existing 250cc machinery, however the entry list consisted of Moto2 machines only. The new class aimed to be economical, with measures such as limiting electronics (which will be supplied only by FIM sanctioned producers), the ban of carbon-ceramic brakes and the use of steel brakes only; however, there are no chassis limitations. All Moto2 bikes use a mandatory 600cc (36.6 cu in) Honda engine based on the Honda CBR600RR, which are prepared by Honda's European specialized tuner Ten Kate, and produces power of about 150 bhp. Control tyres for the new series were provided by Dunlop only, despite early intentions of leaving tyre specifications free.

Season review

MotoGP class
Jorge Lorenzo was crowned MotoGP World Champion for the first time, after he finished third in the Malaysian Grand Prix on 10 October. Second in the championship was Dani Pedrosa, 138 points behind Lorenzo, recording four race victories over the course of the season. He and third-placed Rossi both missed at least three races due to injuries suffered during race weekends; Pedrosa suffered a fractured collarbone at Motegi, while Rossi suffered a broken leg at Mugello, resulting in the first missed races of his entire Grand Prix career. The only other rider to win races during the season was Casey Stoner, who finished fourth in the championship. Stoner won three races in the latter half of the season, winning the inaugural race in Aragón, as well as the races at Motegi and his home race at Phillip Island.

Moto2 class
Nine different riders won races in the secondary Moto2 championship, and former MotoGP rider Toni Elías claimed the inaugural championship title, with three events to spare as his seven victories had taken him out of reach of his rivals. Second place went to Julián Simón, who despite not winning a race, finished on the podium eight times. Third place in the championship went to Andrea Iannone, who achieved three victories but lost out on runner-up in the championship to Simón by just two points. Other riders to win races were Jules Cluzel, Yuki Takahashi, Roberto Rolfo, Alex de Angelis, Stefan Bradl and Karel Abraham.

125cc class
Spanish riders once again dominated the 125cc championship, with a 26-race winning streak for Spanish riders only being broken by Bradley Smith at the final race of the season in Valencia. The top three championship placings went to Spanish riders as Marc Márquez won the championship ahead of Nicolás Terol and Pol Espargaró.

2010 Grand Prix season calendar
The following Grands Prix were scheduled to take place in 2010:

The provisional calendar was announced on 10 November 2009. In case a circuit was not able to hold a scheduled Grand Prix, a reserve race would take place on the same day at the MotorLand Aragón circuit. This was updated six days later, with a date change for the Czech round, moving one week forward. It was announced on 18 March 2010 that Aragón would be included on the calendar, at the expense of the Balatonring, due to the fact that construction work on the latter circuit could not be completed on time. On 19 April 2010, it was announced that the Japanese Grand Prix would be moved from 25 April to 3 October, due to the disruption to air travel after the second eruption of the Eyjafjallajökull volcano in Iceland.

 ‡ = Night race
 † = MotoGP class only
 †† = Saturday race

Calendar changes
 The Japanese Grand Prix was moved back, from 26 April to 3 October, due to the second eruption of the Eyjafjallajökull volcano in Iceland.
 The British Grand Prix moved from Donington Park to the Silverstone Circuit, after a bid by the FIA and Bernie Ecclestone to host Formula 1 from the 2010 season onwards.
 Only the MotoGP class raced during the United States Grand Prix because of a Californian law on air pollution, preventing the 125cc and Moto2 classes from racing.
 The Aragon Grand Prix was added to the calendar as a replacement, after it was announced that construction of the Balatonring was not finished.
 The Portuguese Grand Prix was moved back, from 4 to 31 October.

Regulation changes
The following changes are made to the regulation for the 2010 season:

Sporting regulations
 This season sees the introduction of a completely new class: the Moto2 class. The new bikes will race with 600cc four-stroke engines and will replace the 250cc class and its bikes, which existed until 2009.
 In the Moto2 class, a proposal has been filed in March 2009 for a "One Make Engine Regulation" where all manufacturers were to be consulted if they were interested. After there was interest, the FIM announced that there will be a single engine supplier for the class in April 2009, it being CBR600RR inline-four engines which were to be developed by Honda.
 In March 2009 a proposal was created to ban all Friday practice sessions as part of a cost-cutting measure, but after vocal opposition from top rider Rossi and further talks, those plans were scrapped in the same month.
 From this season onwards, riders are allowed to only use one bike for all the races.
 The minimum weight for a single bike will be two kg more than previously was allowed as compensation.
 The number of engines that can be used without penalty have now been set for the whole championship.
 It is now forbidden for Factory teams to recruit rookies in their teams, and have to start with a Satellite team in their first year instead. Suzuki are exempt from this rule, as they only run one Factory team and have no Satellite teams of their own.
 A new schedule for all events will be announced.
 The maximum number of people which are allowed to work on a bike will be a maximum of five.
 Using riders under contract to practice with MotoGP bikes is not allowed during the season as well as the breaks at any track included on the current year's calendar. A few exceptions were already in place (it is permitted if the practice is added to the event schedule, the practice happens during the day(s) immediately after the race at three circuits, at the circuit where the race has occurred and so on) but a few new ones have been introduced. The new exceptions are:
If the practice is added in the main schedule of the weekend
If the practice is during the day immediately after the Spanish Grand Prix at Jerez and the Czech Grand Prix at Brno, or during the two days immediately after the final Grand Prix of the year, which is in Valencia.
If the practice is allowed by the Race Direction.
The same goes for the winter period. It is forbidden to use contracted riders to practice with MotoGP at any circuit. There were a few exceptions to this rule as well (it is permitted if there's a maximum of six days where Dorna/IRTA organise official tests at tracks which were added to the calendars of the previous or next year and if the activity has been specifically approved by the Race Direction) but these exceptions have been updated for this year as well. The exceptions apply to this rule if:
There's a maximum of six official test days which are arranged by Dorna and the IRTA at Grand Prix tracks which were included in calendars of the last or will be included in the calendar of next year. It is forbidden to test during the period of 1 December of one year and ends on 31 January of the next year, both dates being inclusive. An exception is made for rookie riders, who are allowed a singular three-day test during the November and December period. 
The winter test schedule is approved by the Grand Prix Commission.
In the 125cc and Moto2 class, wildcard riders are spared from these practice restrictions, which only apply to riders under contract in the MotoGP category. Before this decision, wildcard riders were not able to practice or race at any grand prix in the fourteen days before the race.
 Modifications have been made on the Medical Code which covers the minimum medical obligations for race weekends. The medical service consisting of equipment, vehicles and personnel has to be organised in an efficient way with enough people to guarantee that a rider who is hurt can be treated accordingly, with minimum delay and fast transfer to hospitals or other appropriately equipped medical centres to deal with more kinds of injuries or illnesses if this is needed.
 After the retainment of the Friday practice sessions, a new, third experimental Practice session has been introduced for the Aragón race. The aggregate time across all the three practice and qualifying sessions will remain the same as it has been in the previous format. The new session will be held on Friday morning next to the traditional Friday afternoon and Saturday morning sessions. After the success of this rule, it was extended to the Portuguese and Valencian Community races - the final two rounds of the season.
 To avoid extra mileage on the engine because of the extra practice session, the run time has been shortened from one hour to 45 minutes.
Effective 1 May 2010, if a rider has been punished for an engine violation, he has to begin the race from the pits ten seconds, instead of twenty seconds, after the start of the race.

Technical regulations

 Brakes that are made out of carbon composite materials have to be one diameter and two types of mass. The maximum of the diameter will be 320 mm.
 The maximum pressure allowed for the injection of fuel has been set to ten Bar.
 The use of Metal Matrix Composite (MMC) and Fiber Matrix Material (FRM) is now forbidden.
 The use of a sensor to measure the temperature of the tyres is now forbidden.
 The width of the rim will be restricted to two sizes for the front and one size for the rear for all manufacturers. This rule will go into effect in 2012 and will end in 2012. The diameter of all wheels will be limited to 16.5 inches only.
 An exhaust system that is variable is now forbidden.
 Variable Valve Timing (VVT) and Variable Valve Lift (VVL) systems, which are powered by either electricity and/or liquid, are now forbidden.
 A connecting rod cannot be a hollow structure. However, an oil pass tunnel which is less than two mm is allowed.
 The use of a twin clutch system, which is also known as DSG), will be forbidden from now on.
 The use of an automatic transmission is now forbidden. However, an exception is made for manual transmissions which are assisted via the use of small force.
 The use of a Consecutive Variable Transmission is now forbidden.
 For the supplying of GPS units for entertainment purposes like TV broadcasting, only DORNA will be allowed to do so. These GPS units cannot connect to any CPU units of any kind of system.
 The use of an electric or electronic steering damper system is now forbidden.

These rules were additionally added on the 15th of August 2010:

 Rules for the official MotoGP post-race tests have been updated. For these tests which span a full day, all riders will be limited in the amount and specification of tyres that they can use at a single test event. For all practice sessions, a maximum of eight slick tyres and four wet tyres will be assigned, specifically:
 - Front slick tyres: Two of the A specification plus two of the B specification.
 - Rear slick tyres: Two of the A specification plus two of the B specification.
 - Front wet tyres: Two of the standard specification.
 - Rear wet tyres: Two of the standard specification.

In addition, each rider can use one set of tyres (one front and one rear) that they have retained from their assignment for the following race. These tyres be either new or used (used tyres still have to be mounted on wheels from the last race), and the team has to inform the tyre supplier which set of tyres (one front and one rear), if any, they wish to keep for the test within two hours of the last race finish.

 Manufacturer members of the MSMA who did not win at least two dry races in both the 2008 and 2009 seasons, are allowed to use nine instead of six engines total.

2010 Grand Prix season results

 ‡ = Night Race
 † = MotoGP class only
 †† = Saturday race

Participants

MotoGP participants
 The Fédération Internationale de Motocyclisme released 17 bikes entry list on 27 January 2010.

 All entries used Bridgestone tyres.

Moto2 participants
 The Fédération Internationale de Motocyclisme released a 39-bike entry list on 27 January 2010. Also listed were Vincent Lonbois of Marc VDS Racing Team and Anthony West of MZ Racing Team, who were reserves. As it transpired, both would eventually make the grid, through other teams' misfortune, but Lonbois was later replaced by Héctor Faubel. All Moto2 competitors raced with an identical CBR600RR inline-four engine developed by Honda. Teams competed with tyres supplied by Dunlop.

125cc participants
 The Fédération Internationale de Motocyclisme released a 27-bike entry list on 27 January 2010.

 All entries used Dunlop tyres.

Standings

MotoGP riders' standings
Scoring system
Points were awarded to the top fifteen finishers. Rider had to finish the race to earn points.

 Rounds marked with a light blue background were under wet race conditions or stopped by rain.
 Riders marked with light blue background were eligible for Rookie of the Year awards.

Moto2 riders' standings
Scoring system
Points were awarded to the top fifteen finishers. Rider had to finish the race to earn points.

 Rounds marked with a light blue background were under wet race conditions or stopped by rain.

† – Shoya Tomizawa was fatally injured in an accident during the San Marino Grand Prix.

125cc riders' standings
Scoring system
Points were awarded to the top fifteen finishers. Rider had to finish the race to earn points.

 Rounds marked with a light blue background were under wet race conditions or stopped by rain.
 Riders marked with light blue background were eligible for Rookie of the Year awards.

Constructors' standings
Scoring system
Points were awarded to the top fifteen finishers. A rider had to finish the race to earn points.
 

 Each constructor gets the same number of points as their best placed rider in each race.
 Rounds marked with a light blue background were under wet race conditions or stopped by rain.

MotoGP

Moto2

125cc

Teams' standings
 Each team gets the total points scored by their two riders, including replacement riders. In one rider team, only the points scored by that rider will be counted. Wildcard riders do not score points.
 Rounds marked with a light blue background were under wet race conditions or stopped by rain.

MotoGP

References

External links
 Statistics from official website of Grand Prix motorcycle racing

 
Grand Prix motorcycle racing seasons
Grand Prix motorcycle racing